The 2013 Asian Table Tennis Championships were held in Busan, South Korea, from June 30 to July 7, 2013. The Championships were the 21st edition of the Asian Table Tennis Championships.

Schedule
Seven different events were contested at the Championships.

Medal summary

Events

References
 21st Asian Championships Busan 2013 Competition Schedule Draw and Results

 
Asian Table Tennis Championships
Asian Table Tennis Championships
Asian Table Tennis Championships
Table tennis competitions in South Korea
Asian Table Tennis Championships
Asian Table Tennis Championships